The 2002–03 East Tennessee State Buccaneers men's basketball team represented East Tennessee State University in the 2002–03 NCAA Division I men's basketball season. The Buccaneers, led by head coach Ed DeChellis, played their home games at the Memorial Center in Johnson City, Tennessee, as members of the Southern Conference. After finishing tied for first in the conference regular season standings, the Buccaneers won the SoCon tournament to earn an automatic bid to the NCAA tournament as No. 15 seed in the East region. East Tennessee State was beaten by No. 2 seed Wake Forest in the opening round, 76–73.

Roster 

Source

Schedule and results

|-
!colspan=12 style=|Regular season

|-
!colspan=12 style=| SoCon tournament

|-
!colspan=12 style=| NCAA tournament

Source

References

East Tennessee State Buccaneers men's basketball seasons
East Tennessee State
East Tennessee State
East Tennessee State Buccaneers men's basketball
East Tennessee State Buccaneers men's basketball